Barut Aghaji, also rendered as Barut Aqaji, may refer to:
 Barut Aghaji, East Azerbaijan
 Barut Aghaji, Zanjan